Felipe Antonio Bosch Gutiérrez (born 1962) is a Guatemalan businessman.

He is listed as a past president of the Committee of Agriculture, Commerce, Industry and Finance Association on their website, and is listed as a past president of the Industry Chamber (Cámara de Industria de Guatemala) on the latter's website.  According to the Guatemalan newspaper Diario La Hora, Bosch is one of the original directory members who created “Plan Visión de País,” which is an inter-institutional initiative effort to create a long term development plan for the country.  Bosch was a regular columnist in Siglo Veintiuno, one of the leading newspapers in Guatemala. He and his companies have also spearheaded various public policy campaigns. Bosch has organized important relief efforts for poor families and orphans in Guatemala, some of which have been reported by Diario La Hora. He is also a member of the President's Leadership Council for the Inter-American Dialogue.

References

External links
 Official website

Living people
1962 births
Guatemalan businesspeople
Members of the Inter-American Dialogue